Acianthera agathophylla is a species of orchid plant native to Bolivia, Brazil Ecuador Peru.

References 

agathophylla
Flora of Bolivia
Flora of Brazil
Flora of Ecuador
Flora of Peru
Plants described in 2001
Taxa named by Mark Wayne Chase